Luberadz  is a village in the administrative district of Gmina Ojrzeń, within Ciechanów County, Masovian Voivodeship, in east-central Poland.

The village has a population of 260.
There is a palace in Luberadz, that used to be a property of Henryk Baranowski, who died in Enfield, London, England. Late wife of Mr Baranowski, Ms. Mary Gladys Willis Baranowski, after his death, claimed her rights to the property. She set up a foundation to support her rights. The palace survived World War II in good condition. It was constructed for Joseph Dembowski, a Polish nobleman and aristocrat involved in the Kosciuszko Resurrection, by famous Polish classicist style architect Hilary Szpilowski. The palace is on Lydynia river bank and dates back to 1789. Joseph Dembowski was a general inspector of Polish cavalry. He was married to Konstancja Narbutt and they had only one daughter - Cecylia. Cecylia was married to Stanisław Grabowski, who was a natural son of Polish king, Stanislaw August Poniatowski. Cecylia was very well educated. She was an active painter. She could speak a few languages. She had 5 children with her husband Stanislaw Grabowski.

References

Luberadz